The Steinsfjorden Formation is a geologic formation in Norway. It preserves fossils dating back to the Silurian period.

See also

 List of fossiliferous stratigraphic units in Norway

References
 

Geologic formations of Norway
Silurian System of Europe
Silurian Norway
Silurian southern paleotropical deposits